Thomas Falk (born December 28, 1952) is a Swedish sprint canoer who competed in the early 1980s. At the 1980 Summer Olympics in Moscow, he finished seventh in the C-1 1000 m event while being eliminated in the semifinals of the C-1 500 m event.

References
Sports-Reference.com profile

1952 births
Canoeists at the 1980 Summer Olympics
Living people
Olympic canoeists of Sweden
Swedish male canoeists